Edward Joseph Popowski (August 20, 1913 – December 4, 2001), nicknamed "Pop", was an American coach and interim manager for the Boston Red Sox of Major League Baseball. Popowski spent 65 years in organized baseball—all of them in the Boston organization. He was a native and lifelong resident of Sayreville, New Jersey.

21 years as minor league manager
He never played in the big leagues, but began a 21-year minor league managerial career in 1941 with the Centreville Red Sox in the Class D Eastern Shore League. With time out for U.S. Army service during World War II, he would manage and coach with Red Sox farm teams through 1966. He spent many years managing at the Class A and  Double-A levels, working patiently with Boston prospects. In his only Triple-A managerial role, in 1960, he was the last skipper in the history of the Minneapolis Millers of the American Association. Led by future Baseball Hall of Famer Carl Yastrzemski, who batted .339, the Millers posted an 82–72 record but finished out of the playoffs.

Not counting his Centreville tenure, Popowski compiled a record of 1,568 wins and 1,357 losses (.536), with four pennants, during his career as a minor league manager. He also served as a coach for the Triple-A Louisville Colonels in 1951–52.

MLB coach
In 1967, Popowski was promoted to the parent Red Sox as third-base coach under Dick Williams. That season, the Red Sox, who had finished ninth in the ten-team American League in 1966, stunned the baseball world by winning their first pennant since 1946. Popowski was Boston's third-base coach for seven seasons, through 1973. As a third-base coach, he was notable for flipping the ball behind his back to the pitcher when one came to rest inside his coach's box. He had learned the trick with the House of David.

Popowski twice served out a season as acting manager, relieving Williams in 1969, and Eddie Kasko in 1973, the latter for only one game. Popowski won six of the ten major league contests that he managed.

Popowski remained on Boston's MLB staff under new manager Darrell Johnson as first-base coach in 1974, and was a special assignment coach in 1975, when the Red Sox once again won the American League pennant. He was a bench coach for the Red Sox during the 1975 World Series.

In 1976, Popowski began the year as a minor league instructor but he returned to the Boston coaching staff to fill the vacancy created July 19 when Don Zimmer was promoted to manager after Johnson's firing. Popowski coached at third base for part of the season, and in the dugout.

Managerial record

Active in baseball for 65 years
In 1977, he returned to Boston's farm system for good as a roving infield instructor and coordinator of Boston's extended spring training program. Although his responsibilities were gradually reduced as he grew older, he remained active in the Red Sox system through 2001, and his 88th birthday. A field in Boston's training base at Fort Myers, Florida, was named in his honor.

References

External links

Eddie Popowski at SABR (Baseball BioProject)
Eddie Popowski at The Deadball Era

1913 births
2001 deaths
American people of Polish descent
Baseball coaches from New Jersey
Baseball players from New Jersey
Boston Red Sox coaches
Boston Red Sox managers
Centreville Red Sox players
Hazleton Red Sox players
Louisville Colonels (minor league) players
Lynn Red Sox players
Major League Baseball bench coaches
Major League Baseball first base coaches
Major League Baseball third base coaches
Minneapolis Millers (baseball) managers
Minor league baseball managers
People from Sayreville, New Jersey
Roanoke Red Sox players
Scranton Red Sox players
United States Army personnel of World War II